Capo Palinuro Lighthouse is an active lighthouse located in the south-western Italy, roughly  south-west of Salerno, in the southern part of Cilento.

Description
The lighthouse is completely automated, powered by a solar unit and is operated by the Marina Militare with the identification code number 2668 E.F.

See also
 List of lighthouses in Italy
 Cape Palinuro

References

External links

 Servizio Fari Marina Militare

Lighthouses in Italy